Grant Mason (born August 18, 1983) is a former American football cornerback. He was signed by the New Orleans Saints as an undrafted free agent in 2007. He played college football at Michigan.

Mason has also been a member of the Pittsburgh Steelers and San Diego Chargers.

Early years
Mason attended St. Mary's Preparatory in Orchard Lake, Michigan. Grant excelled in football at a young age.

Professional career

Florida Tuskers
Mason was signed by the Florida Tuskers of the United Football League on August 25, 2009.

Post-Career

References

External links
Just Sports Stats
Pittsburgh Steelers bio

1983 births
Living people
Sportspeople from Pontiac, Michigan
Players of American football from Michigan
American football cornerbacks
American football safeties
Michigan Wolverines football players
New Orleans Saints players
Amsterdam Admirals players
Pittsburgh Steelers players
San Diego Chargers players
Florida Tuskers players
St. Mary's Preparatory alumni